Primera División A (Méxican First A Division) is a Mexican football tournament. This season was composed of Apertura 2006 and Clausura 2007. Puebla was the winner of the promotion to First Division after winning Dorados de Sinaloa in the promotion playoff.

Changes for the 2006–07 season
Dorados de Sinaloa was relegated from Primera División.
 The Mexican Football Federation forced that each of the 18 teams participating in the Primera División had a reserve team in Primera 'A'. For this reason, new expansion franchises were created: Pumas Morelos, Tecos 'A', Monarcas Morelia 'A', Santos Laguna 'A' and Gallos de Caliente. Some teams maintained their own identity, but signed partnership agreements with Primera División clubs.
Coyotes de Sonora was moved to Zapotlanejo and was renamed as Académicos de Atlas.
Chivas Coras was moved to Guadalajara and was renamed as C.D. Tapatío.
Lagartos de Tabasco was moved to Coatzacoalcos, where it was renamed Tiburones Rojos, being a reserve team of Veracruz.
Pegaso Anáhuac was promoted from Second Division. However, the team was moved to Colima and was renamed as Pegaso Real Colima.
Guerreros de Tabasco, new expansion team.
Before Clausura 2007, Gallos de Caliente was renamed Club Celaya and was relocated to the homonymous city. Instead, businessmen in Tijuana bought the franchise belonging to Guerreros de Tabasco, moved it to the city and called it Club Tijuana.
Before Clausura 2007, Zacatepec was moved to Mexico City and was renamed as Socio Águila F.C.

Stadiums and locations

Clausura 2007 new teams

Apertura 2006

Group league tables

Group 1

Group 2

Results

Liguilla

(*) Team won the series as best-seeded team.

Quarter-finals

First leg

Second leg

Semi-finals

First leg

Second leg

Final

First leg

Second leg

Clausura 2007

Group league tables

Group 1

Group 2

Results

Liguilla 

(*) The team won the series as best-seeded team.

Quarter-finals

First leg

Second leg

Semi-finals

First leg

Second leg

Final

First leg

Second leg

Relegation table

Promotion final
The promotion final faced Puebla against Dorados to determine the winner of the First Division Promotion. Puebla was the winner.

First leg

Second leg

Notes

References

2006–07 in Mexican football
Mexico
Mexico
Ascenso MX seasons